Two ships of the Royal Australian Navy have been named HMAS Bundaberg, after the city of Bundaberg, Queensland.

, a Bathurst-class corvette launched in 1941 and decommissioned in 1946
, an Armidale-class patrol boat commissioned in 2007 and decommissioned in 2014 after being destroyed by fire

Battle honours
Two battle honours have been awarded to ships named HMAS Bundaberg:
Pacific 1942–45
New Guinea 1943–44

References

Royal Australian Navy ship names